Alexander Popov may refer to:

Science
Aleksandr Iosifovich Popov (1913–1993), Soviet permafrost researcher
Alexander Nikiforovich Popov (1840–1881), Russian organic chemist
Alexander Stepanovich Popov (1859–1906), Russian physicist

Sports
 Aleksandr Popov (weightlifter) (born 1959), Soviet weightlifter
 Alexandr Popov (biathlete) (born 1965), Russian biathlete
 Aleksandr Sergeyevich Popov (born 1971), Russian footballer
 Alexander Popov (swimmer) (born 1971), Russian swimmer
 Alexander Popov (volleyball coach) (born 1972), Bulgarian volleyball player and coach
 Aleksandr Popov (canoeist) (born 1975), Uzbekistani sprint canoeist
 Alexander Popov (ice hockey) (born 1980), Russian professional ice hockey forward
 Alexander Popov (figure skater) (born 1984), Russian pair skater

Other
Alexander Popov (film), a 1949 film about the Russian physicist Alexander Stepanovich Popov
Alexander Nikolayevich Popov (1841–1881), Russian historian, discoverer of the Nominalia of the Bulgarian khans
Alex Popov (architect) (born 1942), Australian architect
 Alex Popov, the plaintiff in the property law case of Popov v. Hayashi

See also
Alex Popow (born 1975), Venezuelan racing driver
 Popov